Abil Ibragimov (born 11 June 1981) is a Kazakhstani wrestler. He competed in the men's freestyle 58 kg at the 2000 Summer Olympics.

References

1981 births
Living people
Kazakhstani male sport wrestlers
Olympic wrestlers of Kazakhstan
Wrestlers at the 2000 Summer Olympics
Place of birth missing (living people)
Azerbaijani male sport wrestlers
21st-century Kazakhstani people